The Cabinet of the Maldives is the most senior level of the executive branch of the Government of the Maldives. It is made up of the President, the Vice President, Attorney General and the Ministers.

Cabinet of Ibrahim Mohamed Solih

Previous administrations

Yameen Abdul Gayoom Cabinet

 Previously held the post in President Dr. Mohamed Waheed Hassan Manik's cabinet respectively.
 Ahmed Adheeb Abdul Ghafoor held the post of Minister of Tourism, Arts and Culture, and Dr. Mariyam Shakeela held the posts of Minister of Environment and Energy in Dr. Mohamed Waheed Hassan Manik's cabinet.  Dr. Shakeela also held the posts of Acting Minister of Foreign Affairs, and Acting Minister of Gender, Family and Human Rights in Waheed's cabinet. Dunya Maumoon held the post of Minister of State for Foreign Affairs, and Mohamed Maleeh Jamal held the post of Deputy Ministry of Tourism, Arts and Culture on Waheed's tenure as president.
 Abdulla Yameen Abdul Gayoom served as Minister of Tourism and Civil Aviation, and Dr. Aishath Shiham as Minister of Youth and Sports on Maumoon Abdul Gayoom's tenure as president.
 Dr. Mohamed Jameel Ahmed is the only person to serve in all cabinets of the last four governments. He is the former vice president in President Abdulla Yameen Abdul Gayoom's Cabinet while he served as Minister of Justice in Maumoon Abdul Gayoom's cabinet, Minister of Civil Aviation and Communication in Mohamed Nasheed's cabinet and as Minister of Home Affairs in Dr. Mohamed Waheed Hassan Manik's cabinet. People's Majlis, which is the legislative body of the Maldives, passed a declaration to remove Dr. Mohamed Jameel Ahmed from the post of Vice President on July 21, 2015.
 Ameen Ibrahim was sacked after the breakup of the coalition between the ruling PPM and JP. First he was asked to "stay at home" hours after the breakup of coalition on 28 May 2014, but in less than 24 hours after he was notified not to attend work, he was dismissed from his post.
 The President abolished Ministry of Transport and Communication and transferred administrations of its previously held mandates of Maldives Civil Aviation Authority and Regional Airports under the Ministry of Tourism, Transport Authority under the Ministry of Economic Development, and Communication Authority of Maldives under the Ministry of Home Affairs.
 The President revised the mandate of Ministry of Health and Gender and established two new ministries under the names of Ministry of Law and Gender and Ministry of Health. Ministry of Law and Gender oversee all government functions related to families, children, women, people with special needs, and human rights while Ministry of Health oversee all government functions related to health and social protection sectors. The President appointed Attorney General Uz. Mohamed Anil as minister responsible for overseeing functions of Ministry of Law and Gender. The President's nomination for Minister of Health Dr. Mariyam Shakeela was dismissed from the cabinet on 11 August 2014, after the Parliament voted against granting approval for her to continue in office. Following the rejection, Ministry of Defense and National Security Colonel (Rtd.) Mohamed Nazim was appointed as Acting Minister of Health.
 Colonel (Rtd.) Mohamed Nazim dismissal came two days after Maldives Police Service conducted a mysterious raid on his residence, confiscating lethal weapons. President's Office spokesperson said that the President made the decision to remove Mohamed Nazim due to the seriousness of allegations against him, and due to sensitivity of the whole matter. Mohamed Nazim denied the allegations against him stating that he didn't believe police should have raided the private residence of the government defense minister in the middle of the night and that no one was safe any longer in the country if the police could raid the country's defense minister's private residence in that manner.

Dr. Mohamed Waheed Hassan Manik’s Cabinet

 Sacked after disputes between the Government as he extended the Villa International Airport Maamigili lease to JP leader MP Qasim Ibrahim for 99 years.
 Sacked after she strongly criticized the President and the Government, stating that her husband was beaten by the Police and his arrest was politically motivated, following the arrest of her husband MP Abdullah Jabir over suspicions of drinking alcohol. Prior to her dismissal, Media Secretary at the President's Office, Masood Imad told the press that she was dismissed because she acted in a manner not suited for a Minister.
 Sacked after he became the Running-mate of MP Abdulla Yameen, presidential candidate of PPM. Prior to his dismissal, Media Secretary at the President's Office, Masood Imad told the press that having a rival candidate's running-mate as the Home Minister would create a conflict of interest as the President himself is contesting in the presidential elections.
Dr. Abdul Samad Abdulla died early morning of Aug. 25, 2013 whilst receiving treatment in Singapore after he suffered from a critical kidney ailment. He was discharged from the Mount Elizabeth Hospital on Aug. 20, 2013 after undergoing dialysis. Butwas rushed to the hospital hours later after he suffered from heart complications resulting from the dialysis. He underwent a heart bypass surgery about 15 years ago. He died at the age of 67 and was survived by his wife and three children.
 Lost the post as the Parliament passed a censure motion against her. The no-confidence motion was passed with the votes of 41 MPs accusing her of failing to protect state institutions and instead back the baseless allegations of a political party. She had been accused of advocating on behalf of JP after her office intervened in the case filed by the party at the Supreme Court seeking annulment of the first round of presidential elections held on 7 September 2013.
 According to the Media Secretary at the President's Office, Masood Imad, Dr. Jamsheed resigned to take up a job at the WHO's Regional Office for South-East Asia (SEARO).
 The Vice President's resignation came hours before the end of the presidential term, and after the country's last ditch attempt to elect a new president before the constitutional deadline of November 11 failed after the Supreme Court suspended the runoff which was slated for 10 November. Neither the Vice President nor the Government stated the cause of the resignation.

Mr. Mohamed Nasheed’s Cabinet

 Resigned as part of the June 29, 2010 en masse resignation of the cabinet.
 Resigned after rejection by parliament, on December 10, 2010.
 Rejected by parliament, on March 21, 2011.
 Resigned on the request of his representative Adhaalath Party when it broke coalition with the government regarding the government's decision to maintain relations with Israel. He was reinstated a week later.

June 2010 En Masse Cabinet Resignation
On 29 June 2010, Nasheed's 13 cabinet ministers resigned en masse, protesting the behaviour of opposition MPs who they said were “hijacking” the powers of the executive and making it impossible for the cabinet Ministers to discharge their constitutional duties and deliver the government's election manifesto. The ministers called on the President to investigate why certain MPs were blocking the government's work, citing allegations of corruption and bribery in parliament.

On 29 June, Maldives Police Service arrested two parliamentarians, Abdulla Yameen, leader of the People's Alliance party and former President Gayoom's half brother, and Gasim Ibrahim, head of the Jumhooree Party, on suspicion of bribing fellow parliamentarians to vote against the government. The police are investigating the two MPs for corruption, along with a third MP, Mohamed Mustapha, of the ruling MDP.

On 7 July, President Nasheed reappointed all thirteen Ministers of the Cabinet, at a ceremony held at the President's Office in Male'.
Speaking at a press conference held shortly after presenting the Ministers with their letters of appointment, President Nasheed said his government would “work towards fulfilling its pledges to the people.”
The President noted that the government has investigated the reasons why cabinet members felt they had to resign and the police have taken appropriate action. The President reiterated that only a small number of MPs are implicated in alleged corruption. “The reputation of the People’s Majlis should not be tarnished because of corruption allegations against a few parliamentarians,” the President said.

Parliament Rejection of Cabinet Members
After the reinstallation of the cabinet on July 7, the cabinet was sent to the parliament for endorsement.

On November 22, the parliament voted and declared that only 5 out of the 12 appointees would be accepted. They also called for the rejected ministers to step down immediately. This resulted in heated arguments between ruling party MDP and opposing DRP, who holds majority seats in parliament. The parliament ruled that the rejected appointees would not be considered as ministers, and refused to allow Finance minister, Ali Hashim present the 2011 state budget for parliament approval. Members of MDP responded to this by declaring that neither parliament or supreme court had rights to dismiss ministers and threatened high members of the parliament.

On December 10, 2010, the Supreme Court of Maldives ruled that the ministers not endorsed by the parliament cannot remain in their posts; and requested their immediate resignation from office.

On December 13, 2010, President Nasheed appointed 2 new ministers and acting ministers for 4 more offices. He also reappointed the rejected Attorney General, Dr. Sawad.

As of February 2011, only 3 of 7 rejected ministers have been replaced. The remaining ministries are currently managed by the other cabinet members.

2011 Parliament Cabinet Endorsement
On 21 March 2011, the parliament voted on the endorsement of 5 new ministers appointed. The result was the endorsement of 4 ministers. These include:
Shifa Mohamed, Minister of Education
Hassan Afeef, Minister of Home Affairs
Mohamed Adil Saleem, Minister of Transport and Communication.
Dr. Mariyam Zulfa, Minister of Tourism.

Only 1 of the appointees were rejected. This was the Attorney General, Dr. Ahmed Ali Sawad, who had been re-appointed by President Nasheed after being rejected by the parliament earlier.
Just hours after the endorsement, two new ministers were sworn into office. This included a new Attorney General and a new Minister of Foreign Affairs.

Uz. Maumoon Abdul Gayoom’s Cabinet

References

Politics of the Maldives
Political organisations based in the Maldives
Maldives